Joachim Ernest of Anhalt (21 October 1536 – 6 December 1586), was a German prince of the House of Ascania, ruler of the principality of Anhalt-Zerbst from 1551, and from 1570 sole ruler of all the Anhalt lands.

Life

Early life
Joachim Ernest was born in Dessau on 21 October 1536 as the second son of John V, Prince of Anhalt-Zerbst, by his wife Margaret, daughter of Joachim I Nestor, Elector of Brandenburg. He received an extensive education under the supervision of his father. On 1 February 1549, just thirteen years of age, he was officially admitted to the University of Wittenberg, where, among others, he studied with the theologian Georg Helt.

Prince of Anhalt-Zerbst
In 1550, after the death of his father, he inherited Anhalt-Zerbst along with his older brother Karl I and his younger brother Bernhard VII.

The death of his uncle George III without male heirs permitted him and his brothers, Karl I and Bernhard VII, to inherit Anhalt-Plötzkau in 1553, while the death of his uncle Joachim I permitted him and his surviving brother Bernhard VII to inherit Anhalt-Dessau in 1561. In 1562 his cousin Wolfgang abdicated Anhalt-Köthen in his favor.

Marriages
In Barby on 3 March 1560 Joachim Ernest married Agnes of Barby-Mühlingen (b. Barby, 23 June 1540 – d. Bernburg, 27 November 1569), daughter of Wolfgang I, Count of Barby-Mühlingen (1502-1564) and his wife, Countess Agnes of Mansfeld (1511-1558). They had six children.

In Stuttgart on 9 January 1571 Joachim Ernest married for a second time to Eleonore (b. Tübingen, 22 March 1552 – d. Schloss Lichtenberg, 12 January 1618), daughter of Christoph, Duke of Württemberg and his wife, Princess Anna Maria of Brandenburg-Ansbach. They had ten children.

Sole ruler of Anhalt
In 1570 the death of his last surviving brother, Bernhard VII, left him as sole ruler of all the Anhalt states, which were finally unified for the first time since their first partition in 1252. Joachim Ernest made Dessau the seat of his government.

Joachim Ernest was a typical Renaissance monarch who generously supported the arts and culture. He sent his sons with their tutors on educational journeys across Europe. Also, he ordered the son of his chancellor, Tobias Hübner, to create a description of the famous knight's games (German: Ritterspiele) that took place at the Dessau court.

In 1572 he created the Regional Legal Code of Anhalt (German: Landesverordnung Anhalts) and in 1582 he founded the Francisceum High School (German: Gymnasium Francisceum) in Zerbst. He was a fervent supporter of the Reformation and the Huguenots.

Death and succession
Prince Joachim Ernest died in Dessau on 6 December 1586. Since succession in the territories of Anhalt was not governed by the rules of primogeniture, Joachim Ernest's seven sons shared rule of the territories of Anhalt until 1603, when the five surviving sons divided their lands among themselves.

Issue

Ancestors

Literature
 Johann Christoph Beckmann: Historie des Fürstenthums Anhalt. 7 Tle. Zerbst 1710. (Ndr. Dessau 1995).
 Gerhard Heine: Geschichte des Landes Anhalt und seiner Fürsten, Heine, 1866, S. 98 ff.
 
 Ferdinand Siebigk: Das Herzogthum Anhalt, Desbarats, 1867, S. 207 ff.

|-
| width="30%" align="center" rowspan="1"| Preceded byJohn V
| width="40%" align="center" | Prince of Anhalt-Zerbst with Karl I (until 1561) and Bernhard VII 1551–1570
| width="30%" align="center" rowspan="4" | Succeeded by Unification of all Anhalt Principalities
|-
| width="30%" align="center" | Preceded byGeorge III
| width="40%" align="center" | Prince of Anhalt-Plötzkau with Karl I (until 1561) and Bernhard VII 1553–1570
|-
| width="30%" align="center" | Preceded byJoachim I
| width="40%" align="center" | Prince of Anhalt-Dessau with Bernhard VII1561–1570
|-
| width="30%" align="center" | Preceded byWolfgang
| width="40%" align="center" | Prince of Anhalt-Köthen with Bernhard VII1562–1570
|-

1536 births
1586 deaths
People from Dessau-Roßlau
Princes of Anhalt
Princes of Anhalt-Zerbst
Princes of Anhalt-Plötzkau
Princes of Anhalt-Dessau
Princes of Anhalt-Köthen
House of Ascania